The 2021 Paradise Jam was an early-season men's and women's college basketball tournament. The tournament, which began in 2000, was part of the 2021–22 NCAA Division I men's basketball season and 2021–22 NCAA Division I women's basketball season. The tournament was played at the Sports and Fitness Center in Saint Thomas, U.S. Virgin Islands. Colorado State won the men's tournament, in the women's tournament Arizona won the Island Division, and Texas A&M won the Reef Division.

Men's tournament

Bracket

Women's Tournament

Island Division

Reef Division 

*Tie Breakers: 1. Head-to-head 2. Net margin head-to-head

References 

Paradise Jam Tournament
Paradise Jam Tournament
Paradise Jam
Paradise Jam